Lyra is a constellation.

Lyra may also refer to:

Music

Instruments
 Lyre, a stringed musical instrument used in ancient Mesopotamia, ancient Greece and elsewhere 
 Lyres of Ur, a stringed musical instrument used in ancient Mesopotamia
 Byzantine lyra, a bowed string musical instrument used in the Byzantine Empire
 Lyra (Cretan), a bowed instrument used in folk music in Crete, Greece
 Lira Calabrese, a bowed instrument used in folk music in Calabria, Italy
 Lira da braccio, a European bowed string instrument of the Renaissance
 Kemenche, a bowed instrument used in folk music in Turkey, Greece and Iran
 RCA Lyra, a line of digital audio players

Songs / Compositions
 "Lyra" (song), a 2007 song by Kate Bush
 "Lyra", a song by Breaking Benjamin from the 2018 album Ember
 "Lyra", a song by Big Red Machine from their self-titled album
 Lyra, a composition for trumpet and piano by Hale A. VanderCook

People

As a given name

 Lyra McKee (1990–2019), Northern Irish journalist and author
 Lyra Taylor (1894–1979), social worker and lawyer from New Zealand
 Lyrae van Clief-Stefanon (born 1971), American poet

As a surname
 Nicholas of Lyra (1270–1349), influential Biblical exegete
 Carlos Lyra (born 1939), Brazilian musician
 Carmen Lyra (1887–1949), pseudonym of female Costa Rican writer, born Maria Isabel Carvajal Quesada
 Cristina Lyra (born 1976), Brazilian sports and newscaster
 Raquel Lyra (born 1978) Brazilian lawyer and politician 
 Débora Lyra (born 1989), Brazilian actress, model and beauty pageant titleholder
 Fernando Lyra (1938–2013), Brazilian politician who served as Minister of Justice
 João Lyra (1931–2021), Brazilian businessman and politician
 Markus Lyra (born 1945), Finnish retired diplomat

Stage name
 Lyra_(singer), Irish singer-songwriter and musician, Laura Brophy

Characters
 Lyra Belacqua, one of the two protagonists in Philip Pullman's His Dark Materials trilogy
 She-Hulk (Lyra), a Marvel Comics superhero
 Lyra, a character in the game and anime Mega Man Star Force
 Lyra (Pokémon), the female player character in Pokémon HeartGold and SoulSilver
 Lyra Heartstrings, a background character in My Little Pony: Friendship Is Magic
 Lyra (Silver Key), a Celestial Spirit character in Fairy Tail
 Lyra Erso, a character in the Star Wars universe
 Lyra Dawnbringer, an angel in Magic: The Gathering
 Lyra, a hero in the Vainglory (video game) MOBA game

Places
 The Latin name of Lier, Belgium
 K. Lyra, a Lier football club
 K. Lyra-Lierse Berlaar, a Lier football club
 Lyra, Queensland, a locality in Australia
 Lyra railway station
 Lyra, Ohio, a community in the United States
 Lyra Reef, a coral atoll in Oceania

Vessels
 HMS Lyra, the name of four ships of the Royal Navy
 Alfa-class submarine (Russian: Лира, Lyra), a class of hunter/killer nuclear powered submarines with a NATO reporting name of Alfa class

Other uses
 Lyra (given name)
 Lyra, aerial hoop used in circus performance
 Lyra (neuroanatomy) or psalterium, part of the commissure of fornix or hippocampal commissure
 Lyra (virtual assistant), an intelligent personal assistant developed by Artificial Solutions
 Lyra, a novel series by Patricia Wrede
 Lyra (TV series), a Philippine television drama series broadcast by GMA Network
 Lyra (codec) A lossy audio codec developed by Google.

See also
 LYRA (Lyman Alpha Radiometer) – a solar ultraviolet radiometer
 Lira (disambiguation)
 Lyran (disambiguation)
 Lyria (disambiguation)
 Lyre (disambiguation)